I Can Quit Whenever I Want: Masterclass is a 2017 Italian crime comedy film directed by Sydney Sibilia.

It is the sequel to 2014 I Can Quit Whenever I Want and the second installment in the I Can Quit trilogy. A sequel entitled I Can Quit Whenever I Want: Ad Honorem was released in November 2017.

Cast

References

External links
 

2017 films
2017 comedy films
2010s crime comedy films
Films about drugs
Films directed by Sydney Sibilia
Films set in Rome
Films shot in Rome
Italian crime comedy films
Latin-language films
2010s Italian-language films
2010s Italian films
Rai Cinema films
Fandango (Italian company) films